"So Good" is a song recorded by American rapper B.o.B, released on February 21, 2012, through Grand Hustle Records and Atlantic Records, via digital download as the second single from his second studio album, Strange Clouds (2012). The single was issued physically in Germany on May 4. It was written by B.o.B, Brent Kutzle, and its producer Ryan Tedder, the frontman of the pop rock band OneRepublic, which also features with additional vocals. The song also appears in the 2013 film The Internship, starring Owen Wilson and Vince Vaughn, as well as the first episode of Netflix's romantic comedy television series, Love.

Critical reception
Digital Spy gave the following review of the song: "When he's not high as a kite, it seems B.o.B. has quite the interest in the arts. "She says that I'm her favourite, cause she admires the art - Of Michelangelo with the flow," he declares on his latest single 'So Good' - and the referencing of history's finest artists doesn't stop there. "Picasso with the bars, She's well put together like a piece by Gershwin," he adds about his latest love interest over an easy-going mix of chilled piano and head-nodding beats. While it's an ambitious claim to glide high with Renaissance figureheads, B.o.B's fun-loving attitude and care-free coolness does evoke a certain popular Michelangelo - if we're talking about the Teenage Mutant Ninja Turtles version, that is."

Chart performance
The song debuted on the U.S. Billboard Hot 100, on the week of March 10, 2012, at number eleven, with 164,000 downloads on the week of release. The song also peaked at number 7 on the UK Singles Chart, making it B.o.B's fourth top-ten single. As of September 6, 2012, So Good has sold over 1 million copies in the United States and been certified double platinum in that territory. In 2013, the song was featured in the 2013 film The Internship.

Music video
On February 14, B.o.B released a trailer for the music video, which featured previously unseen visuals, and announced a premiere date of March 21, 2012. On March 14, a second teaser for the music video was uploaded to B.o.B's official YouTube channel. The music video, directed by Justin Francis, was released on March 21, 2012.

Track listing
 Digital download
 "So Good" – 3:33

 Digital EP
 "So Good" – 3:33
 "Play the Guitar" (featuring André 3000) – 3:24
 "Strange Clouds" (featuring Lil Wayne) – 3:46

 CD single
 "So Good" – 3:33
 "Play the Guitar" (featuring André 3000) – 3:24

Charts and certifications

Weekly charts

Year-end charts

Certifications

Release history

References 

2012 singles
B.o.B songs
Songs written by B.o.B
Songs written by Ryan Tedder
Grand Hustle Records singles
Songs written by Brent Kutzle
Song recordings produced by Ryan Tedder
2011 songs
Pop-rap songs